Thomas McKee Whatley (born August 7, 1970) is an American politician. He is a Republican who represented district 27 in the Alabama State Senate from 2010 to 2022.

Political career 

In 2010, Whatley defeated Democratic incumbent T. D. Little to win the 27th district's seat in the Alabama State Senate. He was re-elected in 2014 and 2018.

In 2022, Whatley faced Auburn City Councilman, Jay Hovey, in the Primary Election, in May, on the Republican Ballot. On election night, Whatley trailed Hovey by four votes. After the provisional votes were counted, Hovey had won the election by one vote, making him the Republican nominee for Alabama Senate District 27. The results of this election would be questioned by Whatley, who decided to take it to the ALGOP for further examination. This ALGOP intervention would result in weeks of deliberation and a change in the Primary Election result; however, as of July 1, 2022, the ALGOP vacated its earlier decision of counting an illegal vote from, Mrs. Kenney as a tie, resulting in Councilman Hovey as the official Republican nominee for Alabama Senate District 27.

Electoral record 

In 2018, Whatley was unopposed in the Republican primary for the 27th district seat.

References 

1970 births
Living people
People from Opelika, Alabama
Auburn University alumni
Thomas Goode Jones School of Law alumni
21st-century American politicians
Republican Party Alabama state senators